On January 4, 2020, U.S. President Donald Trump made several tweets stating that if Iran retaliated against the assassination of Qasem Soleimani, "the United States will hit 52 Iranian sites, some at a very high level and important to Iran and the Iranian culture, very fast and very hard." The threat was widely described as a "pretty clear promise of a war crime" and was condemned by the international community as well as other American politicians. However, on January 5, Trump renewed the threat, and said "They're allowed to kill our people... and we're not allowed to touch their cultural sites? It doesn't work that way."

In response, Iranian officials compared Trump to the Islamic State, Adolf Hitler and Genghis Khan. Targeting cultural sites is a war crime under the 1954 Hague Convention. On January 6, Defense Secretary Mark Esper distanced The Pentagon from Trump’s threats, and confirmed that the U.S. will follow the laws of armed conflict, which prohibit targeting cultural sites. By January 7, Trump backed away from his threats.

Threats

First threat
In a series of tweets, Trump wrote that "if Iran strikes any Americans, or American assets," the U.S. has targeted 52 Iranian sites, "some at a very high level & important to Iran & the Iranian culture, and those targets, and Iran itself, WILL BE HIT VERY FAST AND VERY HARD."

Second threat
A day after the first threat, Trump, speaking to reporters aboard Air Force One, defended his threat and said: "They’re allowed to kill our people, They’re allowed to torture and maim our people. They’re allowed to use roadside bombs and blow up our people. And we’re not allowed to touch their cultural site? It doesn’t work that way.”

Reactions

United States

The Pentagon distanced itself from Trump's tweets about targeting cultural sites. Defense Secretary Mark Esper was asked if the US would target cultural sites, and he said that the US will “follow the laws of armed conflict.” When asked if that meant "no, because targeting a cultural site is a war crime?", Esper said "That's the laws of armed conflict." However, Secretary of State Mike Pompeo defended Trump's tweets.

US senators Elizabeth Warren and Chris Murphy labeled the tweets as "threatening to commit war crimes." Congresswoman Alexandria Ocasio-Cortez tweeted that "Threatening to target and kill innocent families, women and children - which is what you’re doing by targeting cultural sites - does not make you a “tough guy.” It does not make you “strategic.” It makes you a monster."

Joe Biden also warned against "Trump's irrational behavior." "The President of the United States is threatening to commit war crimes on Twitter. God help us all!", said Congresswoman Ilhan Omar.

Iran
Iran's Foreign Minister, Mohammad Javad Zarif, said Trump violated international law in “Friday’s cowardly assassinations” and “threatens to commit again new breaches of JUS COGENS. Targeting cultural sites is a WAR CRIME.”

In another tweet, Zarif wrote: "A reminder to those hallucinating about emulating ISIS war crimes by targeting our cultural heritage: Through MILLENNIA of history, barbarians have come and ravaged our cities, razed our monuments and burnt our libraries. Where are they now? We're still here, & standing tall."

"Like ISIS, like Hitler, Like Genghis! They all hate cultures. Trump is a ‘terrorist in a suit.’ He will learn history very soon that NOBODY can defeat ‘the Great Iranian Nation & Culture", wrote Azari Jahromi, Iran's Minister of Communications and Information Technology, on Twitter.

Iranian President Hassan Rouhani responded to Trump's warning: "Those who refer to the number 52 should also remember the number 290", referring to the 1988 shooting down of Iran Air Flight 655 by a U.S. warship in which 290 were killed.

Using the hashtag #IranianCulturalSites, Iranian people responded to the Trump's tweets by sharing photos of their favorite Iranian cultural sites. The BBC reported that Trump's tweets made Iranians, who were divided as soon as the news of the killing of Qasem Soleimani broke, united against the United States.

United Kingdom 

UK Foreign Secretary Dominic Raab said cultural sites were protected by international law. He also said that Britain expected that to be respected. The British Prime Minister, Boris Johnson warned the US that "attacking Iranian cultural sites could constitute a war crime under international law."

UNESCO
Audrey Azoulay, the director-general of the United Nations Educational, Scientific and Cultural Organization (UNESCO), pointed out that both Iran and the United States were signatories to the 1972 convention to protect the world's natural and cultural heritage. Francesco Bandarin, a former senior official at UNESCO, wrote "if the US destroys Iranian cultural sites, President Trump will be criminally liable by international law." U.N. Secretary-General António Guterres, without mentioning Trump by name, released a statement stressing that international cooperation must continue to preserve humanity's treasures.

Aftermath
On Tuesday, Donald Trump backed away from his threats to target Iranian cultural sites. "I like to obey the law." he said during an Oval Office appearance. He also added: "Think of it. They kill our people. They blow up our people. And then we have to be very gentle with their cultural institutions? But I’m OK with it. It’s OK with me.”

See also
 Thirteen revenge scenarios
List of World Heritage Sites in Iran

References

Presidency of Donald Trump
Trump administration controversies
Aftermath of the assassination of Qasem Soleimani
Iran–United States relations